Road Rules: All Stars is the first season of the MTV reality game show, The Challenge. Unlike later seasons, the show followed alumni of The Real World as they went on a typical Road Rules-type adventure around the United States in a non-competitive format. It is the only season without the term Challenge in its title. The season premiered on April 20, 1998.

Format
Much like the original format of Road Rules, five alumni from past seasons of The Real World were brought together to participate in a series of missions as they traveled across the United States and New Zealand in a Winnebago. Unlike following seasons of Real World/Road Rules Challenge, this season only consisted of cast members from The Real World, and was made up of a much smaller cast. Again as with Road Rules, all of the cast's cash and credit cards were confiscated for the duration of the series, and if the participants completed all the assignments, they would win a "handsome reward". At the end of the series, each cast member won a trip to Costa Rica.

Cast
Mr. Big: David "Puck" Rainey from The Real World: San Francisco

Tasks
 Prove Existence of Ghosts (Monroe, Connecticut): The cast must spend the night in an abandoned mental hospital and prove that there are ghosts living in there.
 Sheep Shearing/Cow Milking (Wellington, New Zealand): The first part of the task has the cast gathering a herd of sheep, holding them down and then shearing their wool. The second part of the task has the women milking cows via a special machine that sucks out the milk.
 Fly by Wire (Wellington): Each of the castmates will have to fly on a fan-propelled rocket that is attached to a wire between two mountains.
 Zorbing (Auckland, New Zealand): Each of the castmates face off against each other in giant hamster balls and race down a steep hill. The winner will be given $150.
 Urban Rap (Auckland): The cast are tasked to jump down the side of a building, wearing a harness. The mission is only considered complete if everyone participates.
 Hot Dog on a Stick (Los Angeles, California): The cast have to work a full day at "Hot Dog on a Stick".
 Cook Off (Los Angeles): The men and women compete against each other in a "cook off" and have two hours to present the other team a meal.
 Improv Performers (Los Angeles): The cast are instructed to act in an improv performance called "Cookin' with Gas".
 Record a Song (Los Angeles): The cast were instructed several days prior to write a theme song for Road Rules: All Stars and are instructed that they will all be recording the song.

Game summary

Final results
Each cast member won a trip for two to San José, Costa Rica.

Episodes

References

External links
 Road Rules: All Stars cast information and show data at the Internet Movie Database

The Challenge (TV series)
1998 American television seasons
1998 American television series debuts
Television shows set in Montreal
Television shows filmed in Montreal
Television shows set in New York (state)
Television shows filmed in New York (state)
Television shows set in Auckland
Television shows set in Wellington
Television shows filmed in New Zealand
Television shows filmed in Los Angeles
Television shows set in Los Angeles